Mamane Sani Ali (born 14 December 1968) is a Nigerien sprinter. He competed in the men's 100 metres at the 2000 Summer Olympics.

References

External links

1968 births
Living people
Athletes (track and field) at the 2000 Summer Olympics
Nigerien male sprinters
Olympic athletes of Niger
Place of birth missing (living people)